Westside F.C. is a Nigerian football club, in the town of Iléṣà, in Osun State sponsored by the Ilesa West Local Government Council. They play in the third level of professional football in Nigeria, the Nigeria Amateur League Division 1.
After finishing 3rd in their second division group in 2010, they bought the Amateur Division 1 slot from Anambra United F.C. after the team was relegated from the Nigeria Division 1 after the 2010 season.

Current squad

External links
Roster/pictures from COD United game March 2011

Football clubs in Nigeria
Osun State
2007 establishments in Nigeria